Seyah Takan (also Romanized as Seyah Takān) is a village in Kahnuk Rural District, Irandegan District, Khash County, Sistan and Baluchestan Province, Iran. At the 2006 census, its population was 45, in 12 families.

References 

Populated places in Khash County